Aaron Parker (born May 21, 1998) is an American football wide receiver who is a free agent. He played college football at Rhode Island.

College career
Parker played  for the Rhode Island Rams for four seasons. He finished his collegiate career with 216 receptions for 3,460 yards and 30 touchdowns in 44 games played.

Professional career

Dallas Cowboys
Parker signed with the Dallas Cowboys as an undrafted free agent on April 25, 2020, shortly after the conclusion of the 2020 NFL Draft. He was waived by the Cowboys during final roster cuts on September 5, 2020, and was resigned to the team's practice squad the following day After the season Parker was re-signed by the Cowboys to a reserve/futures contract on January 4, 2021. He was waived at the end of the preseason on August 31, 2021.

Carolina Panthers
Parker was signed by the Carolina Panthers to their practice squad on September 2, 2021. Parker was elevated to the Panthers' active roster on October 24, 2021. He signed a reserve/future contract with the Panthers on January 10, 2022. He was waived on May 12, 2022.

Kansas City Chiefs
Parker was signed by the Kansas City Chiefs on June 16, 2022. He was waived on August 27, 2022.

References

External links
Carolina Panthers bio
Rhode Island Rams bio

1998 births
Living people
Players of American football from Maryland
American football wide receivers
Rhode Island Rams football players
Carolina Panthers players
Kansas City Chiefs players